NA-223 Badin-I is a constituency for the National Assembly of Pakistan. The constituency was known as NA-224 (Badin-I) prior to 2018, the delimitation of 2018 changed it to NA-229 (Badin-I).

Members of Parliament

2018-2022: NA-229 Badin-I

Election 2002 

General elections were held on 10 Oct 2002. Ghulam Ali Nizamani of PPP won by 70,231 votes.

Election 2008 

General elections were held on 18 Feb 2008. Ghulam Ali Nizamani of PPP won by 87,102 votes.

Election 2018 

General elections were held on 25 July 2018.

See also
NA-222 Tando Muhammad Khan
NA-224 Badin-II

References

External links 
Election result's official website

NA-224